The 1958 National Football League season resulted in a tie for the Eastern Conference championship between the Cleveland Browns and the New York Giants, both at 9–3, requiring a one-game playoff. The Giants swept both games during the regular season, including a 13–10 win on December 14 at Yankee Stadium. Injured kicker Pat Summerall made a 49-yard field goal late in the game in a snowstorm to break the tie and force the playoff.

This conference championship game was played on December 21 at Yankee Stadium; the winner then hosted the idle Baltimore Colts (9–3), champions of the Western Conference, in the NFL Championship Game on December 28.

Tournament bracket

Both games were at Yankee Stadium in New York City

Eastern Conference championship

NFL Championship game

References

National Football League Playoffs
1958
Playoffs